Pragya Nagar is located in Muzaffarpur. Well-known teachers are residents. A religious tree named Malang Baba is located here.

Geography

Transit
Ramdayalu Nagar Railway Station & Bus Stand.

Educational institutes
DAV Public School (School up to 10th Class)
RDS College (Degree College)
Central School (School up to 10th Class)
SKJ Law College (College for LLB)

Villages in Muzaffarpur district